In mathematics, vector spherical harmonics (VSH) are an extension of the scalar spherical harmonics for use with vector fields. The components of the VSH are complex-valued functions expressed in the spherical coordinate basis vectors.

Definition
Several conventions have been used to define the VSH. 
We follow that of Barrera et al.. Given a scalar spherical harmonic , we define three VSH:

 
 
 

with  being the unit vector along the radial direction in spherical coordinates and  the vector along the radial direction with the same norm as the radius, i.e., . The radial factors are included to guarantee that the dimensions of the VSH are the same as those of the ordinary spherical harmonics and that the VSH do not depend on the radial spherical coordinate.

The interest of these new vector fields is to separate the radial dependence from the angular one when using spherical coordinates, so that a vector field admits a multipole expansion

Main properties

Symmetry
Like the scalar spherical harmonics, the VSH satisfy

which cuts the number of independent functions roughly in half. The star indicates complex conjugation.

Orthogonality

The VSH are orthogonal in the usual three-dimensional way at each point :

They are also orthogonal in Hilbert space:

An additional result at a single point  (not reported in Barrera et al, 1985) is, for all ,

Vector multipole moments
The orthogonality relations allow one to compute the spherical multipole moments of a vector field as

The gradient of a scalar field
Given the multipole expansion of a scalar field

we can express its gradient in terms of the VSH as

Divergence
For any multipole field we have

By superposition we obtain the divergence of any vector field:

Curl
For any multipole field we have

By superposition we obtain the curl of any vector field:

Laplacian
The action of the Laplace operator  separates as follows:

where  and

Examples

First vector spherical harmonics

Applications

Electrodynamics
The VSH are especially useful in the study of multipole radiation fields. For instance, a magnetic multipole is due to an oscillating current with angular frequency  and complex amplitude

and the corresponding electric and magnetic fields, can be written as

Substituting into Maxwell equations, Gauss's law is automatically satisfied

while Faraday's law decouples as

Gauss' law for the magnetic field implies

and Ampère–Maxwell's equation gives

In this way, the partial differential equations have been transformed into a set of ordinary differential equations.

Alternative definition 

In many applications, vector spherical harmonics are defined as fundamental set of the solutions of vector Helmholtz equation in spherical coordinates.

In this case, vector spherical harmonics are generated by scalar functions, which are solutions of scalar Helmholtz equation with the wavevector . 

Vector spherical harmonics are defined as:
 longitudinal harmonics  
 magnetic harmonics  
 electric harmonics  
Here we use harmonics real-valued angular part, where , but complex functions can be introduced in the same way.

Let us introduce the notation . In the component form vector spherical harmonics are written as:

There is no radial part for magnetic harmonics. For electric harmonics, the radial part decreases faster than angular, and for big  can be neglected. We can also see that for electric and magnetic harmonics angular parts are the same up to permutation of the polar and azimuthal unit vectors, so for big   electric and magnetic harmonics vectors are equal in value and perpendicular to each other.

Longitudinal harmonics:

Orthogonality 

The solutions of the Helmholtz vector equation obey the following orthogonality relations: 

All other integrals over the angles between different functions or functions with different indices are equal to zero.

Rotation and inversion

Under rotation, vector spherical harmonics are transformed through each other in the same way as the corresponding scalar spherical functions, which are generating for a specific type of vector harmonics. For example, if the generating functions are the usual spherical harmonics, then the vector harmonics will also be transformed through the Wigner D-matrices

The behavior under rotations is the same for electrical, magnetic and longitudinal harmonics.

Under inversion, electric and longitudinal spherical harmonics behave in the same way as scalar spherical functions, i.e.

and magnetic ones have the opposite parity:

Fluid dynamics

In the calculation of the Stokes' law for the drag that a viscous fluid exerts on a small spherical particle, the velocity distribution obeys Navier–Stokes equations neglecting inertia, i.e.,

with the boundary conditions

where U is the relative velocity of the particle to the fluid far from the particle. In spherical coordinates this velocity at infinity can be written as

The last expression suggests an expansion in spherical harmonics for the liquid velocity and the pressure

Substitution in the Navier–Stokes equations produces a set of ordinary differential equations for the coefficients.

Integral relations 

Here the following definitions are used:

In case, when  are spherical Hankel functions, one should use the different formulae. For vector spherical harmonics the following relations are obtained:

where , index  means, that spherical Hankel functions are used.

See also

 Spherical harmonics
 Spinor spherical harmonics
 Spin-weighted spherical harmonics
 Electromagnetic radiation
 Spherical basis

References

External links
 Vector Spherical Harmonics at Eric Weisstein's Mathworld

Vector calculus
Special functions
Differential equations
Applied mathematics
Theoretical physics